Roger Tritz (21 August 1914 – 1940) was a French boxer who competed in the 1936 Summer Olympics. In 1936 he finished fourth in the welterweight class. He lost in the semi-finals to the upcoming silver medalist Michael Murach and was not able to compete in the bronze medal both with Gerhard Pedersen.

References
Roger Tritz's profile at Sports Reference.com
Biography of Roger Tritz 

1914 births
1940 deaths
Welterweight boxers
Olympic boxers of France
Boxers at the 1936 Summer Olympics
French male boxers